Christian Fauré (born 2 March 1951) is a French former cyclist. He competed in the individual road race event at the 1980 Summer Olympics.

References

External links
 

1951 births
Living people
French male cyclists
Olympic cyclists of France
Cyclists at the 1980 Summer Olympics
Sportspeople from Gers
Cyclists from Occitania (administrative region)
20th-century French people